The Arkadelphia Commercial Historic District encompasses the historic commercial core of Arkadelphia, Arkansas, the county seat of Clark County.  Arkadelphia was settled in 1842, and its commercial district is located in one of the older parts of the city, near the Ouachita River.  Most of the buildings were built between c. 1890 and c. 1920, and are built out of brick and masonry; the oldest building in the district is estimated to have been built in 1870.

The district was listed on the National Register of Historic Places in 2011.  The district consists of two blocks of Main Street, between 5th and 7th Streets, and three blocks of Clinton Street, between 6th and 9th Streets.  A number of buildings in the district were destroyed by an F-5 tornado which struck the town in 2009.

See also
National Register of Historic Places listings in Clark County, Arkansas

References

Historic districts on the National Register of Historic Places in Arkansas
Neoclassical architecture in Arkansas
Buildings and structures completed in 1890
Geography of Clark County, Arkansas
Buildings designated early commercial in the National Register of Historic Places
National Register of Historic Places in Clark County, Arkansas
Buildings and structures in Arkadelphia, Arkansas